Francesco Antonio Franzoni (1734–1818) was an Italian sculptor and restorer.

Biography
Born in 1734 in the marble city of Carrara and trained there, Francesco Antonio Franzoni settled in Rome in the 1760s and established a workshop that specialised in the restoration of antique Roman sculpture, for which there was an insatiable demand, scarcely supplied by redoubled efforts at excavations. He worked on restoring, completing and refinishing sculptures destined for the Museo Pio-Clementino and provided marble revetments and sculptural details for its interiors, notably the biga (two-horse chariot) assembled in 1788 from antique elements, in the sala del Biga of the Braccio Nuovo. He worked for Pope Pius VI, for whom he filled a room with animal sculptures, some made up from antique fragments, in the Palazzetto del Belvedere; he also worked for the papal family at Palazzo Braschi.

He died in Rome in 1818.

Some other sculptors in Rome renowned for their restorations 
 Orfeo Boselli
 Ippolito Buzzi
 Bartolomeo Cavaceppi
 Ercole Ferrata
 Francesco Fontana
 Francesco Nocchieri
 Giovanni Battista Piranesi
 Vincenzo Pacetti

Further reading
 I. Bignamini, C. Hornsby, Digging And Dealing In Eighteenth-Century Rome (2010), p. 268-269
 R. Carloni, 'Francesco Antonio Franzoni e Giuseppe Giovanelli nel Museo Pio-Clementino', in Strenna dei Romanisti; 64 (2003), p. 73-86
 R. Carloni, 'Un mediatore del commercio marmoreo da Carrara a Roma alla fine del Settecento: lo scultore Francesco Antonio Franzoni', in Strenna dei Romanisti; 63 (2002), p. 71-91
 R. Carloni, 'L'Inventario del 1818 di Francesco Antonio Franzoni', in Labyrinthos; 13 (1994), p. 231-250
 R. Carloni, 'Francesco Antonio Franzoni restauratore e "antiquario" nel tempo di Pio VI', in Alma Roma; 22 (1981), p. 32-44

References

External links 
 Getty Museum: Francesco Antonio Franzoni: marble side table and drawing

1734 births
1818 deaths
18th-century Italian sculptors
Italian male sculptors
19th-century Italian sculptors
19th-century Italian male artists
People from Carrara
18th-century Italian male artists